General elections were held in Uganda between 20 and 24 October 1958. They were the first elections to the Legislative Council, and were boycotted by the Ganda. The result was a victory for the Uganda National Congress, which won five of the ten seats.

Results

References

Uganda
1958 in Uganda
Elections in Uganda
Uganda Protectorate